Maria, i Aschimi (Μαρία, Η Άσχημη - Maria, The Ugly One) is the Greek adaptation of the Colombian telenovela Betty la Fea. The series ran from 2007 to 2008 on Mega Channel in Greece. The series starred Aggeliki Daliani in the title role of Maria and Anthimos Ananiadis as the boss who became the man of her dreams.

Series background
Mega Channel in Greece is airing its own version titled Maria, i Aschimi (Μαρία, Η Άσχημη - Maria, The Ugly One). Maria exudes intelligence, humor, and kindness, but what she is missing is conventional beauty. She considers her appearance to be an obstacle in her search for employment, despite her collection of degrees, which are displayed proudly by her parents, Kaiti and Irakles. Having no luck in her job search after her departure from the National Bank which she worked for 3 years as assistant of the principal of the bank who retired, Maria decides to try for a job for which she is overqualified, secretary to Alexis Mantas, the new president of a noted fashion house called EcoModa. Alexis is the most coveted bachelor in Athens, but he has recently gotten engaged to Markella, who tries to get him to choose her best friend, Lilian, to be his secretary and to keep an eye on him. Lilian doesn't have Maria's natural intelligence or fine education, but she has a beautiful appearance, which makes her a better superficial fit at the fashion house.

This adaptation was originally supposed to start airing on November 1, 2006, but within two weeks of that date the show was removed from Mega Channel's schedule. Finally, it began on January 1, 2007, at 21:00 and although it was scheduled to move at 18:15 two weeks later, due to its high ratings (± 45% according to Agb Hellas and more than 2 million viewers) finally remained in the prime-time slot of the channel. Starting from Season 2, the series moved to afternoon at 19:10. On June 30 the series won the most Beloved Series during the 2008 TV ETHNOS Awards.

The theme song of the series "Poso S' Agapo" was written by acclaimed Greek music composer Stamatis Kraounakis.

The series ended on Monday 23 June 2008 with a triple-header (3 episodes in a day). The first episode of the three was aired at 18:50 before the Central News show and the last 2 episodes were aired in its first season time slot at 21:00 after the Central News show.

The series today are still popular in the Internet because all the episodes have been uploaded to YouTube and especially the 243rd episode has 2 million views, the 248th episode has 1.4 million views and the last two episodes which aired together has surpassed 2.2 million views. Also, another reason for the popularity of the series is its viewing from teenagers who were kids or they didn't born during the viewing of the series.

Following the relaunch of Mega on 17 February 2020, the series airs daily at 2:40pm

Characters 

 Maria Papasotiriou: The ugly girl
 Alexis Mantas: the handsome president of Ecomoda, Stefanos' and Margaritas' son, Lizas' brother
 Filippos Deligiannis: the opponent of Alexis Mantas (starting from season 2)
 Lilian Patrikarea: the beautiful secretary of Alexis Madas, Markellas' best friend
 Markella Stefaneli: Alexis' girlfriend, Maria's enemy, Sergios' and Eleonoras' Sister
 Sergios Stefanelis: Markellas' and Eleonaras' brother
 Eleonora Stefaneli: Markelas' and Sergios' sister
 Stefanos Mantas: Alexis' and Lizas' Father
 Margarita Manta: Alexis' and Lizas' Mother
 Liza Manta: Stefanos' and Margaritas' daughter, Alexis' sister
 Dimitris Vrettos: Alexis' best friend
 Nikolas Markakis: Maria's best friend
 Kristo: the Fashion designer of Ecomoda
 Keti Papasotiriou: Maria's mother
 Heracles Papasotiriou: Maria's Father
 Marhta Leventi: Maria's friend and worker of Ecomoda
 Sofia Kanaki: Maria's friend and worker of Ecomoda
 Sandra Danieilidi: Maria's friend and worker of Ecomoda
 Marianna Langeri: Maria's friend and worker of Ecomoda
 Christina Hatzaki: Maria's friend and worker of Ecomoda
 Loukia Harisiadou: Maria's friend and worker of Ecomoda
 Tzina Kasimati: the woman that helped Maria
 Argyro Markaki: Nikolas' mother
 Jerry Linardatos: Usher of Ecomoda

Mega Channel original programming
Yo soy Betty, la fea
2007 Greek television series debuts
2008 Greek television series endings
2000s Greek television series
Greek drama television series